Fukrey is a 2013 Indian Hindi-language comedy film, directed by Mrighdeep Singh Lamba, produced by Farhan Akhtar and Ritesh Sidhwani, and starring Pulkit Samrat, Manjot Singh, Varun Sharma, Ali Fazal, Priya Anand, Vishakha Singh, Pankaj Tripathi and Richa Chadda. The story and dialogues are written by Vipul Vig and the screenplay is written by Vig and Lamba. Produced under the Excel Entertainment banner, the film was released on 14 June 2013.  Despite a poor opening, the film went on to become a sleeper hit. The film is available on Netflix, Amazon Prime Video and Disney+ Hotstar.

Plot

Delhi-based school backbenchers Vikas "Hunny" Gulati and Dilip "Choocha" Singh are perpetually dreaming of making it big. They want to get into the local college but don't have the required grades. The college guard Pandit tells them that he can provide them with the leaked class XII papers to them, for a significant amount. Choocha has this god-gift where he can get the winning number of any lottery in his dream and Hunny has the talent to sand the exact number out of his dream. The protagonists could not afford or collect the money required, so they decided to sell the papers to other students but failed there too.

Meanwhile, through Pandit, they meet Zafar, a former student of the college and a struggling musician. The fourth character is Lali, whose father Billa, runs a sweet shop. Lali is currently pursuing his degree through correspondence and like Hunny and Choocha, also wants to get into the same college, where his girlfriend Shalu, who ignores him all the time studies but doesn't have the marks. Pandit asks Lali to donate ₹ 250,000 in the college development fund to get admission. Lalli asks his father for the money, but he refuses to say the college is too costly.

Zafar's girlfriend, Neetu, who has broken up with him over his career choices is now giving private tuitions to Lali so that he could attain enough marks to get into the college of his dreams and Also To make Shalu Jealous Getting close to Neetu. On the other hand, Zafar's father faces a stroke and is paralysed now, for his treatment, the struggling musician needs money badly. The four meet up at Pandit's office where Hunny explains his scheme. However, since now they all together need a lot of money, they need someone to invest lakhs. So, on Zafar's insistence, Pandit takes them to meet a local gangster, Bholi Punjaban where Hunny tells them their scheme. Bholi is ready to invest, and Lali also gives his shop papers as a mortgage. Bholi tells them to come the next day with the number. However, the same night everyone except Choocha falls asleep.

The next morning, Choocha narrates a fake dream which Hunny interprets and gets a number. They go to Bholi and tell the number. But it backfires, and Bholi loses her money. Now to recover her money, she gives them a packet containing drug pills which Zafar, Hunny and Lali have to sell at a rave party the same night. She keeps Choocha as security with her. At the party, Police and Narcotics teams conduct a raid, and Lali escapes with a packet with the police chasing him. Lali manages to fool the cops and reaches Neetu's place. He also sees Zafar there. Neetu throws the drugs down the drain just as the police are about to search her home. The cops leave her place warning Lali. Meanwhile, Zafar tells the whole story to Neetu and Also he was Thinking that Neetu was falling for him, but she refuses, Zafar also warns him. Lali also calls Choocha telling him to run from Bholi's house which he succeeds in doing.

The next morning, all the five land up at Bholi's place. She gives them 24 hours to pay all the money due; otherwise, she would take the money by selling Lali's shop. The four are fighting at Zafar's place where Choocha tells them the truth about not seeing the dream. However, he says to them that he slept last night, and he saw a dream. Zafar is not interested while Lali, Hunny and Neetu are. Hunny interprets the dream, but they are short of cash even after Neetu is ready to give her savings. However, next morning Lali is able to borrow some money from a homeless man who used to remove parts from Lali's motorbike. They invest and win a huge amount.

They go to Bholi's house and give her the money. Then Hunny tells Bholi that he wants to sell those drug pills again and gives her an advance. Impressed Bholi goes inside and returns with the pills only to be caught red-handed by the police and Narcotics who have raided her home. In a flashback, it is shown that while Hunny, Choocha, Lali and Neetu were investing the money, Zafar met the Narcotics division and made a plan to catch Bholi and also calls Neetu, Lali, Choocha and Hunny where they confess to the police. Now with Bholi behind bars, the police pardon the four, and they are free.

Three months later, it is shown that Hunny and Choocha have become rich and are entering the same college on horses as they had planned at the beginning of the film while Pandit is shocked to see them also Lali making new girlfriends and Jealous Shalu. Priya reunites with Honey, and Neetu gets engaged to Zafar. Lali, Zafar, Neetu and Priya are having a good laugh.

Cast

 Pulkit Samrat as Vikas "Hunny" Gulati
 Manjot Singh as Lali Halwai
 Ali Fazal as Zafar Bhai
 Varun Sharma as Dilip "Choocha" Singh
 Priya Anand as Priya Sharma, Hunny's love interest 
 Vishakha Singh as Neetu Raina, Zafar's fiance 
 Pankaj Tripathi as Pandit
 Richa Chadda as Bholi Punjaban; Bholi's character is loosely based on alleged pimp Sonu Punjaban
 Bhupesh Rai as Bhuppa Ali
 Ashraful Haque as Smakiya
 Anurag Arora as Narco Officer
 Ajay Trehan as Inspector Khanna
 Pooja Kalra as Fat woman on the bus
 V K Sharma as Hunny's and Choocha's school teacher
 Smarty as Young boy in Gurudwara
 S.K. Lalwani as Zafar's Dad
 Kumkum Ajit Kumar Das as Zafar's mother
 Divya Phadnis as Shalu, Lali's Former Girlfriend. 
 Tejeshwar Singh as Monty
 Sanjeeva Vats as Lottery Seller
 Shrikant as Minister's P.A
 Arun Verma as Pradhan
 Jatinder Bakshi as Jagrata Singer
 Mehak Manwani as Lali's New girlfriend in the college
 Michael Obidke as Eddie
 Sukhwinder Chahal as Passerby in Gurudwara
 Majinder Singh P. Kareer as Billa Halwai, Lali's father

Production

Filming

The film was shot extensively in Delhi at various locations, including Miranda House, where most of the college sequences and opening song was shot.

Re-release
The film was re-released in theatres due to public demand and popularity. The PVR Cinemas showed Fukrey along with other movies in September 2013.

Reception

Critical reception
Taran Adarsh of Bollywood Hungama rated it 3.5/5 and quoted, "Fukrey is a twisted and delectably uproarious take on the shortcuts the youth of today indulge in". Rajeev Masand of CNN-IBN rated the movie 2.5/5 and noted that, "A tighter script and more screen time for the excellent Pankaj Tripathi, as enterprising campus security guard Panditji, might have helped turn this moderately entertaining film into a rollicking good caper." Saibal Chatterjee of NDTV gave the film a 3/5 rating.

Box office
Fukrey grossed around 142 million within the first five days of its release. By the end of its second week, the film had collected 290 million nett in the domestic markets. The business of the film was varied across India. It was a success in Delhi/UP and East Punjab, as well as in Rajasthan but average in the rest of the country. The film collected around 20 million nett on its second Friday which was just 20% less than the first day. The second weekend and second week business were excellent for the film. Fukrey collected 360 million in the domestic markets by the end of its theatrical run.

Soundtrack
Distributed and released by T-Series, the soundtrack of Fukrey is composed by Ram Sampath, with lyrics by writers Vipul Vig and Mrighdeep Singh Lamba for one song each, and Munna Dhiman for the rest. Fukrey is thus the first Excel Entertainment production to not feature songs written by producer Farhan Akhtar's father and regular lyricist Javed Akhtar.

Reception
The music of the film received good reviews, especially for the song "Ambarsariya", an adaptation of a traditional Punjabi folk song, performed by Sona Mohapatra.

Awards and nominations

Sequel

On 30 January 2016, a sequel to the film was announced, featuring the original cast and directed by Lamba and produced by Excel Entertainment. Filming began in August 2016 in Delhi. The film was released on 8 December 2017.

A threequel titled Fukrey 3 commenced shooting on 13 March 2022 with the cast of the previous two films reprising their roles and Mrighdeep Singh Lamba as the director.

Animated series
An animated series for kids, titled as Fukrey Boyzzz, jointly produced by Excel Entertainment and Discovery Kids India, premiered on 12 October 2019 on Discovery Kids India, which showcases the animated avatars of popular characters Hunny, Choocha, Laali, and Bholi Punjaban, along with other characters. Fukrey Boyzzz: Space Mein Fukrapanti, an Indian animated comedy film directed by Avinash Walzade was released in 2020 continuing from the series.

See also

List of Bollywood comedy films

References

External links

 
 
 

2013 films
2010s Hindi-language films
2010s buddy comedy films
2013 romantic comedy-drama films
Films set in Delhi
Films shot in Delhi
Indian buddy comedy films
Indian romantic comedy-drama films
2013 comedy-drama films
Films adapted into television shows